Richard Norris Williams defeated the defending champion William Johnston in the final, 4–6, 6–4, 0–6, 6–2, 6–4 to win the men's singles tennis title at the 1916 U.S. National Championships.

The event was played on outdoor grass courts and held at the West Side Tennis Club in Forest Hills, New York from Monday, August 28 through Tuesday, September 5, 1916.

Draw

Final eight

Earlier rounds

Section 1

Section 2

Section 3

References

External links
 1916 U.S. National Championships on ITFtennis.com, the source for this draw

Men's singles
1916